Rigadon can refer to:
 A Baroque dance, also spelt as Rigaudon
 The renamed character of Passepartout from the 1980s cartoon series Around the World with Willy Fog.